is a Japanese performer, actor and DJ who is a member of Exile and also the leader of the Japanese all-male dance and music group Generations from Exile Tribe. Alan is represented with LDH.

Early life 
Shirahama was born on 4 August 1993 to a Filipino mother and a Japanese father. He has a younger brother and an elder sister, Loveli, who is a fashion model and television personality.

In 2008, he started attending Matsuyama's EXPG (Exile Professional Gym).

Career

2009–2012: Pre-debut 
In April 2010 Shirahama became a member of Gekidan EXILE (Exile Theatrical company) which he withdrew from after getting selected  as Generations' candidate member in July 2011.

In March 2012, he graduated from Hinode High School; and he became an official member of the group in April 2012

He played his first lead role in NTV's drama Sugarless starring Gaku Shiiba which theme song "Brave it out" was decided as Generations' major debut song.

2014–present: Breakthrough  

In January 2014, Hiro appointed Shirahama to be the leader of Generations.

On 27 April 2014, Shirahama was one of five people who passed the final audition to join Exile as performers, making him currently member of both Exile and Generations.

On 31 October 2015, he began his career as a DJ at the stage of "U・F・O~Electric Halloween~ MIXed by PKCZ" .

Filmography

Movies

Short films

TV Dramas

Web Dramas

Stageplay

TV shows

Voice Acting

Advertisements

Music videos

Other

Photobook

Producing

References

External links
 Official Website (in English)
Official Weibo 
Generations profile (in English)
Generations profile 
Exile profile 
Agency profile 

1993 births
Living people
Japanese male dancers
Japanese people of Filipino descent
People from Matsuyama, Ehime
Musicians from Ehime Prefecture
Japanese male actors of Filipino descent
LDH (company) artists
21st-century dancers
21st-century Japanese male actors
Japanese male film actors
Japanese male television actors